Sky Rock is a small rock, 3 m high, marking the southern extent of the Welcome Islands off the north coast of South Georgia. Charted and named by DI personnel in 1930.

See also
Whalers Passage

References

Rock formations of South Georgia